Sergeli is one of 12 districts (tuman) of Tashkent, the capital of Uzbekistan.

Overview
This suburban district, established in 1981, is the greatest one per area and hosts Tashkent International Airport. In 2020 it lost 18.64 km2 to the new district Yangihayot.

Sergeli is the southernmost district of Tashkent and borders with Chilanzar, Yakkasaray, Mirobod and Bektemir. It borders also with Tashkent Region.

References

External links

Districts of Tashkent
Populated places established in 1981
1981 establishments in the Soviet Union